V is the debut studio album by American singer Vanessa Hudgens, first released on September 26, 2006, via Hollywood Records. The album has been given mostly positive reviews. V debuted in the United States at twenty-four, selling 34,000 copies in its first week. The album has spawned two singles, lead "Come Back to Me" and follow-up "Say OK". In February 2007, the album was certified Gold by RIAA. As of April 2008, the album has sold 570,000 copies in the United States. Hudgens supported the album with serving as an opening act for The Cheetah Girls' The Party's Just Begun Tour and also on the High School Musical: The Concert tour. The album was voted as the seventh best album of 2007 by the readers of Billboard.

Writing and development
After participating in High School Musical, Hollywood Records made a proposal for Vanessa to start a solo music career. The album was produced June 1 to August 31, 2006, as the record company insisted that the album was to be recorded and produced quickly.

"I did it my way. My single "Come Back to Me" is kind of pop and R&B, but the rest of the album brings a bit of pop rock, electronic music, and some ballads. It is a mixture of everything," said Vanessa, who at first thought of making a purely dance album.

Hudgens stated the title of the album stands for Vanessa, but also for variety, because the album is a mix of genres and styles.

Release

Singles
"Come Back to Me" was released as Vs lead single on September 12, 2006. It peaked at number 55 on the Billboard Hot 100, becoming Hudgens's highest-charting single as a solo artist. Internationally, the track was a moderate commercial success, peaking at number 12 in France and peaking at top 40 in Australia as well as peaking at number 6 in New Zealand. The song received generally positive reviews from critics. The accompanying music video featured Hudgens dancing and socializing with her friends, including her sister, Stella Hudgens, and Alexa Nikolas.

"Say OK" was released as the second single from album on January 12, 2007, and was sent to US mainstream radio two months later, on March 27, 2007. The track was comparatively less commercially successful than the album's previous single, peaking at number 61 on the Billboard Hot 100. There are two versions of music video, the first version takes place on the High School Musical: The Concert Tour in Seattle, Washington. While the second officially released version, featuring Zac Efron, has gathered over 180 million views on YouTube.

"Let's Dance" was released as a promo single only in the United States. The song was released digitally on September 25, 2007. The live version of the song recorded during the High School Musical tour was used for promotion. The song was also used on Dancing with the Stars on US network ABC. The song failed to enter the Billboard Hot 100.

Promotion

There were different editions issued, each containing thirteen or fourteen tracks with varying bonus tracks. A twelve-track version was then released internationally on November 28, 2006. The CD was then released on January 17, 2007, in Japan (sixteen tracks) and on March 17, 2007, in Australia (twelve tracks). She had recorded two covers. "Whatever Will Be", which was originally released by Tammin Sursok the year before, and "Afraid", which was initially recorded by Melissa Schuman and intended for her unreleased album "Stereotyped".

The album was re-released again in a limited Deluxe edition format, released in Japan, Malaysia, and Taiwan. The song "Let's Dance" was included in a Wii game, called We Cheer 2.

Hudgens promoted the album when opening for the Cheetah Girls during their The Party's Just Begun Tour. She also promoted her album on the High School Musical: The Concert tour, regularly singing "Say OK". Hudgens performed "Come Back to Me", "Say OK" and "Let's Dance" in the concert. She also performed various songs off the album on her Identified Summer Tour which also promoted her second studio album Identified.

Reception

Critical reception

Upon its release, V received generally positive reviews from most music critics. Mentioned in Identified review, Heather Phares praised the album "was her first step toward a less overtly Disney-affiliated career: released by the studio's Hollywood label, it used Christina Aguilera's soulful pop as a template; even if its songs were a bit faceless, they had surprisingly sophisticated production values." She noted that Hudgens "sings about love, dancing, and hanging with her girls" and repeated again in Identified, "the production outclasses the songs and the singing".

Nate Cavalieri of Rhapsody Music said: "This collection of pop and sugary R&B keeps the messages squeaky clean, even with hints that she is willing to break your shyness. The singles are well built and the best are "Come Back to Me" dancing to "Let's Dance" and a dedication surprisingly emotive long-distance, "Afraid".

Commonsense Media's Tony Whittum said: "The first album Hudgens is well positioned to win the approval of the teen market. Her 12 relatively simple, romantic and sweet pop songs about boys, hanging out with friends, dancing, female power and tribulations of a very young life are delivered with the latest plain, recycled, computer programmed beats and hip-hop." He further added, "Hudgens is strong, stable and comfortable in the medium, as when she is singing a dance song "Let's Dance" and pop rock "Never Underestimate a Girl." Otherwise, your voice can range from the diminutive and shy the strident edge. With her voice and her musical talent mature, it would be nice to see Hudgens take more risks and produce something more original. Then, as their audience matures, they will not leave it behind".

The album was nominated as #7 on "Album of The Year" by Billboard Readers' Choice.

Chart performance
V debuted on the US Billboard 200 in early October 2006 at number twenty-four on the chart, with 34,000 copies sold in its first week. The album dropped off the Billboard 200 after thirty-two weeks on the chart. 
On February 27, 2007, the album was certified gold in the US for shipments to retailers of 500,000 copies. The album was certified platinum in Argentina for sales of 8,000 copies, under DVD category. 
As of April 2008, the album has sold 570,000 copies in the US. The album sold 1 million copies worldwide.

Track listing

Charts

Weekly charts

Year-end charts

Certifications

Credits

 Vocals: Vanessa Hudgens.
 Background vocals: Vanessa Hudgens, Ulrika Lundkvist, Bridget Benenate, Char Licera, Anna Nordell, Jeanette Olsson, Keely Pressly, Dionyza Sutton, Leah Haywood.
 Keyboard: Matthew Gerrard, Leah Haywood.
 Baixo: Jack Daley.
 Guitar: Tyrone Johnson, Scott Jacoby, Daniel James, Tim Pierce, Matthew Gerrard, Darren Elliott.
 Piano: Mattias Bylund.
 Violino: Martin Bylund.
 Viola: Irene Bylund.
 Drums: Bradley Polan, Jay Jay.
String arrangement – Nicky Scappa, Read.
 Strings: Read.

 Executive producers: Jon Lind, Mio Vukovic & Johnny Vieira.
 Vocal production: Antonina Armato, Tim James, Wizard of Oz, Arnthor, Matthew Gerrard, Jay Jay, David Norland, Leah Haywood, Daniel James, Kent Larsson, AJ Junior & Johnny Vieira.
 Additional production: Leah Haywood & Daniel James  (On tracks: 11, 12).
 Vocal arrangement: David Norland, Leah Haywood & Daniel James.
 Engineer: Nigel Lundemo, Brian Reeves, Wizard of Oz, Jake Davies & Ben Eggehorn.
 Coordenação: Jon Lind & Mio Vukovic.
 Artistic direction and design: Enny Joo.
 A&R: Jon Lind & Mio Vukovic.
 Mixed: Serban Ghenea.
 Photography: Andrew McPherson.

Release history

References

2006 debut albums
Albums produced by Dreamlab
Albums produced by Matthew Gerrard
Albums produced by Rock Mafia
Hollywood Records albums
Vanessa Hudgens albums